Hear Me is the sixth EP by American rock band Imagine Dragons, released in the United Kingdom and Ireland on November 25, 2012. The EP was released to precede the release of the band's debut studio album, Night Visions in Europe, ala the Continued Silence EP in North America. The EP features "Hear Me" as the title track, and three other tracks from Night Visions.

Release and promotion
The Hear Me EP was first announced on October 27, 2012. Imagine Dragons producer Alex da Kid announced the release of the EP on Twitter. A sample of the EP, lasting 2 minutes and 13 seconds was posted online afterwards. To further promote the release of the EP, the band devised a competition in which fans could receive free copies of the "Hear Me" CD single, signed by all four members of the band.

Singles
"Hear Me" was released as the lead single from Night Visions in the United Kingdom and Ireland, while "It's Time" served as the lead single in other regions, including the rest of Europe.

Track listing

Release history

References

External links
 Imagine Dragons Official site

2012 EPs
Imagine Dragons EPs
Albums produced by Alex da Kid
Interscope Records EPs
Kidinakorner albums